The Columbia Savings Bank Building, also known as the Columbus Savings Bank, is a landmark office building located at 700 Montgomery Street in the Financial District of San Francisco, California.

The building is registered as a San Francisco Landmark. It was deemed significant as the "oldest of four buildings that represent the beginning of Italian banking in San Francisco", along with the Bank of Italy building and two other bank buildings.

Tenants 
The Columbia Savings Bank Building was originally built for the Columbus Savings and Loan Society, as a bank which primarily served the Italian community in San Francisco.

In 1923 the building at 700 Montgomery became, for two years, the Columbus Branch of the Bank of Italy.

From 1939 to 1953 the ground floor was occupied by the Pisani Printing and Publishing Company.

The upper floor was occupied by the Italian consulate from 1948 to 1951, and the Indonesian consulate from 1954 to 1956.

From 1973 until 1996, the building was the studio for KIOI radio station.

Beginning in 2000, it hosted the law offices of former Mayor Joseph L. Alioto and his daughter, Angela Alioto.

References

Bank buildings in California
Office buildings in San Francisco
North Beach, San Francisco
San Francisco Designated Landmarks
1904 establishments in California

Office buildings completed in 1904